4th Republic is a 2019 Nigerian political drama film directed by Ishaya Bako and written by Ishaya Bako, Emil Garuba and Zainab Omaki. It stars Kate Henshaw-Nuttal, Enyinna Nwigwe, Sani Muazu, Ihuoma Linda Ejiofor, Bimbo Manuel, Yakubu Muhammed, Sifon Oko, Jide Attah, and Preach Bassey Produced by Amateur Heads and Griot Studios, 4th Republic was funded by grants from the John D. and Catherine T. MacArthur Foundation and the Open Society Initiative for West Africa (OSIWA) centered around a governorship aspirant, Mabel King (Kate Henshaw) in the aftermath of a violent and fraudulent election that results in the death of her campaign manager, Sikiru (Jide Attah). The film was screened in seven universities in Nigeria in collaboration with the Independent National Electoral Commission (INEC) and Enough is Enough (EiE Nigeria) to curb electoral violence. It was also endorsed by the National Orientation Agency (NOA).

The movie made its debut on Netflix on June 13, 2020.

Cast 

Kate Henshaw-Nuttal as Mabel King
Enyinna Nwigwe as ike
Sani Muazu as Governor Idris Sanni
Linda Ejiofor as Bukky Ajala
Bimbo Manuel as St. James
Yakubu Muhammed as Danladi
Sifon Oko as Lucky Ameh
Preach Bassey 
Rekiya Ibrahim Atta
Emil Hirai-Garuba
Alfred Atungu

Production 
4th Republic is a joint production between Amateur Heads and Griot Studios Ltd with Bem Pever, Ishaya Bako, Kemi ‘Lala’ Akindoju, and Ummi A. Yakubu serving as producers. It was written by Ishaya Bako, Emil Garuba and Zainab Omaki.  The film explores the themes of Nigerian political system that chronicles the political and electoral system in the last two decades.

Release 
4th Republic premiered at the IMAX, Filmhouse Cinemas in Lekki, Nigeria on April 7, 2019. It was released across cinemas in Nigeria on April 9, guests who attended the premiere include Sola Sobowale, Tope Oshin, Kehinde Bankole, Chigul, Waje, Lilian Afegbai, Denrele Edun, Japheth Omojuwa and Linda Osifo, among others.

External links

References 

Nigerian comedy-drama films
2019 comedy-drama films
2019 films
2010s English-language films
English-language Nigerian films
Films about political movements